Rose Price may refer to:

Sir Rose Price, 1st Baronet (1768–1834) of the Price Baronets, Sheriff of Cornwall, 1814.
Sir Rose Lambart Price, 3rd Baronet (1837–1899) of the Price Baronets
Sir Rose Price, 4th Baronet (1878–1901) of the Price Baronets
Sir Rose Francis Price, 6th Baronet (1910–1979) of the Price Baronets